Dr. José Matías Delgado University (UJMD), is a private university located in Antiguo Cuscatlán, La Libertad, El Salvador. Founded on September 15, 1977, it is one of the first private institutions of higher education established in the country.

History
Named in honor of Salvadoran priest, lawyer, politician and national hero José Matías Delgado, La Matías was conceived as a nonprofit institution by Salvadoran intellectuals, academics and businessmen, being its main objective forming professionals with the capability of improving and directing the business and judicial institutions of the time. Its intent from its foundation on 1977 has been to defend and develop free market principles.

By 1978 the University began its academic activities with three faculties: the "Dr. Isidro Menéndez" Faculty of Jurisprudence and Social Sciences; the "Dr. Santiago I. Barberena" Faculty of Economics and the "Francisco Gavidia" Faculty of General Culture and Fine Arts. Following the events of the Salvadoran Civil War, the University continued its activities despite the circumstances of the conflict, ingreasing the demand of higher education at the time where new faculties and careers developed. It was geographically decentralized during its early years in San Salvador, but was brought together on a single location (the current campus, in the municipality of Antiguo Cuscatlán) in 1986; in 1992 the faculties of Agriculture and Engineering were created and then in 1993 with the faculty of Health Sciences. Between 2004 and 2005 a second campus was opened, relocating the Economics and Jurisprudence faculties; in 2008 another campus was established in the municipality of Soyapango by an agreement with the Padre Arrupe Foundation, becoming a specialized nursing school.

Today, La Matías has a reputation for offering a high quality education without neglecting the principles of professional ethics, as expressed in its motto Omnia Cum Honore (Everything with Honor). It offers 27 undergraduate degrees, 11 postgraduate degrees and a large variety of diplomas and courses for continuing education, consisting of a faculty of more than 600 professors. Since its foundation until 2018, the University was administrated by well-known Salvadoran writer, dramatist and jurist, David Escobar Galindo.

Campus

The University currently has two campuses, with the following faculties and schools:

Main Campus
 Faculty of Arts and Sciences "Francisco Gavidia"
 School of Architecture
 School of Design "Rosemarie Vázquez de Ángel"
 School of Communications
 School of Psychology
 School of Fine Arts
 Faculty of Health Sciences "Dr. Luis Edmundo Vásquez"
 Faculty of Agriculture and Agricultural Research "Julia Hill de O'Sullivan"
 Faculty of Engineering
 Faculty of Postgraduate and Continuing Education

Second Campus
 Faculty of Jurisprudence and Social Sciences
 Faculty of Economics, Enterprise and Business

The University has libraries in each campus,  which possess a large quantity of digital and printed resources, including 19th century bibliographic accounts. Additionally, it has technical workshops, sports fields, computing centers, medical clinics with psychological assistance and laboratories for chemistry, physics, medicine and agricultural research, among others.

Academics

Undergraduate programs
José Matías Delgado University allows students to qualify for the following professional areas and degrees:

 Medicine
 Nursing
 Food Engineering
 Agroindustrial Engineering
 Agricultural Biotechnology Engineering
 Environmental Management Engineering
 Industrial Engineering
 Logistics and Distribution Engineering
 Electronics and Communications Engineering
 Architecture
 Interior Architecture
 Graphic Design
 Craft Design

 Communication Sciences
 Psychology
 Performing Arts
 Music
 Law
 International Relations
 Business Administration
 Business Economics
 Business Finance
 Marketing
 Accounting
 Information Technology
 Tourism

Postgraduate programs
Postgraduate studies at José Matías Delgado University consist of the following professional areas and degrees:

Master degrees
 Constitutional Law
 Administrative Law
 Business Administration
 Business Finance
 International Business
 Project Management
 Strategic Human Resources
 Organizational Communication
 Clinical Psychology
 Public Administration

Doctorate degrees
 Private Law

Student life
La Matías offers the opportunity for students to get involved in extracurricular activities like theatre groups, musical choirs, volunteering and sports like the following: chess, soccer, track and field, swimming, basketball, volleyball and taekwondo, among others. It also provides foreign language education like English (which is an academic requirement for graduation), French, Italian and Portuguese.

Distinctions
Since its foundation, the University has recognized the works of  outstanding Savadoran people in their service for the country's community, being the following:

Honoris causa
 Guillermo Trigueros
 Luis Escalante Arce
 Alfonso Rochac
 Jorge Lardé y Larín
 Mercedes de Altamirano
 Didine Poma de Rossotto
 María de Boet
 Cecilia Gallardo de Cano
 Armando Calderón Sol
 Felicidad Salazar-Simpson
 Carlos Quintanilla Schmidt
 Francisco Calleja

Meritorious professors

 Adolfo Oscar Miranda
 Manuel Arrieta Gallegos
 Julia Díaz

See also

 Education in El Salvador
 List of universities in El Salvador

References

Further reading
 Universidad Dr. José Matías Delgado. Catálogo Estudiantil 2018 (2018). 276 pp.

External links
Official website

Universities in El Salvador
Educational institutions established in 1977
1977 establishments in El Salvador